Marc Gini  (born 8 November 1984 in Castasegna) is a Swiss alpine skier, specializing in slalom and giant slalom.

He started his career in 2000, and has competed in World Cup races since 2003. He was Swiss slalom champion in 2005, 2006, and 2007, and additionally also Swiss giant slalom champion in 2006. He won his first World Cup race on 11 November 2007.

His sister Sandra Gini is also a professional alpine skier competing in the World Cup. After a similarly unsuccessful winter in 2014/15, Gini showed an upward trend again in the 2015/16 season. He won two European Cup slaloms and finished third in the discipline rankings. In the 2016/17 World Cup season, he managed to finish in the points three times. On April 7, 2017, he announced his retirement as a top athlete.

World Cup victories

References

External links
Sandra and Marc Gini's website

1984 births
Living people
Olympic alpine skiers of Switzerland
Alpine skiers at the 2010 Winter Olympics
Swiss male alpine skiers